Bruno Barbatti (September 27, 1926 – March 31, 2020) was a Swiss scholar and writer. He was born in Zurich to an Italian father and a German mother. He studied at the universities of Fribourg, Paris (Sorbonne), Florence and Zurich, where he obtained a doctorate in German. For 35 years, he taught at the Kantonsschule Rämibühl, where he was once a student.

Barbatti is best known for his book Berber Carpets of Morocco. He did extensive field work in Morocco, especially Marrakech, where his wife Dominique was a high school teacher for several years. The couple built up an extensive collection of carpets over the years. Some were exhibited at Museum Bellerive in Zurich in 1996.

He married the French writer and teacher Dominique Abadie.

References

20th-century Swiss writers
Writers from Zürich
1926 births
2020 deaths
Swiss people of Italian descent
Swiss people of German descent
University of Fribourg alumni
University of Zurich alumni
Swiss expatriates in Morocco
University of Paris alumni
University of Florence alumni
Swiss expatriates in France
Swiss expatriates in Italy
Swiss male writers